Tipperary competed in the 1998 National Hurling League and the 1998 Munster Championship. It was Len Gaynor's second year in charge of the team with Declan Ryan named as team captain. Finches continued as sponsors of Tipperary GAA.

1998 National Hurling League

Division 1B table

1998 Munster Senior Hurling Championship

References

External links
Tipperary GAA Archives 1998
Tipperary v Waterford 7 June at YouTube

Tipp
Tipperary county hurling team seasons